Orana is a region in central northern New South Wales, Australia.  it had an estimated population of 113,824 people. The major localities include Dubbo and Cobar.

The Orana region encompasses twelve  local-government areas: the Dubbo Regional Council, the Mid-Western Regional Council, and the Shires of  Bogan,  Bourke,  Brewarrina,  Cobar,  Coonamble,  Gilgandra,  Narromine,  Walgett,  Warren and  Warrumbungle. This region corresponds approximately with the Australian Bureau of Statistics North Western Statistical Division.

Etymology

The term 'Orana' is said to mean "welcome" in an Aboriginal language, perhaps that of the local Wiradjuri group. Orana was popularised as an Australian Aboriginal word in the carol Orana to Christmas Day, released in 1948, though its true origins are obscure. Linguist David Nash suggests that Orana's true origin may be a Polynesian language, noting that Kia orāna is a common greeting on Rarotonga, the largest of the Cook Islands and Ia Orana in Tahitian means "hello". He says the word was first ascribed as Aboriginal in the 1920s and specifically Wiradjuri only from the 1970s, and does not fit the usual form of Wiradjuri words.

Economy
Agriculture is the predominant industry in the Orana region, with 86% of the area under agricultural land use. This land makes up 27% of the total agricultural land in New South Wales. The output equals approximately 658 million or 11.7% of the state's agricultural production. Agriculture industry jobs provide over 20 percent of the employment in the region. Wine made from the small number of vineyards in the Orana region may be labelled as Western Plains.

References

Regions of New South Wales
Central West (New South Wales)
Newell Highway